General elections were held in Japan on 20 April 1917. The Rikken Seiyūkai party led by Hara Takashi emerged as the largest party in the House of Representatives, winning 165 of the 381 seats.

Electoral system
The 381 members of the House of Representatives were elected in 51 multi-member constituencies based on prefectures and cities. Voting was restricted to men aged over 25 who paid at least 10 yen a year in direct taxation.

Results

References

General elections in Japan
Japan
1917 elections in Japan
April 1917 events
Election and referendum articles with incomplete results